CCDC40 is the gene in humans that encodes the protein named coiled-coil domain containing 40.

Function 
This gene encodes a protein that is necessary for motile cilia function. It functions in correct left-right axis formation by regulating the assembly of the inner dynein arm and the dynein regulatory complexes, which control ciliary beat. Mutations in this gene cause ciliary dyskinesia type 15, a disorder due to defects in cilia motility. Alternative splicing results in multiple transcript variants. [provided by RefSeq, Aug 2011].

References

Further reading

External links